Aristides Burton Demetrios (1932 - December 12, 2021) was an American sculptor.

Life
Aristides Burton Demetrios, also known as "Aris," was born in 1932 and raised in Massachusetts, where he lived during childhood in Gloucester. His father George Demetrios was a classical sculptor, trained by Antoine Bourdelle, a student of Auguste Rodin. His mother Virginia Lee Burton was the renowned author and illustrator of children's books, including Mike Mulligan and His Steam Shovel, and The Little House, for which she won the prestigious Caldecott Medal. She was also a textile designer, founding the Folly Cove cooperative. 

After graduating from Harvard College in 1953, Aris Demetrios served as an officer for three years in the US Navy. He studied art and sculpture at the George Demetrios School from 1956 to 1959. He studied at the University of California School of Architecture, in 1959.

In 1963, Demetrios won his first national sculpture competition, when his proposed design was selected for a major fountain commission on the campus of Stanford University (White Memorial Fountain, or "Mem Claw"). Soon after, he was chosen for a public art commission in Sacramento in front hof the County Courthouse. Next he was selected by David and Lucille Packard to design and fabricate a sculpture for the entry to the Monterey Bay Aquarium (Forms Sung In A Kelp Forest).  

Demetrios lived in Santa Ynez, California. He died December 12, 2021 in Santa Barbara, California, where he lived with his wife, Ilene Nagel. He was 89.

Career

Demetrios successfully completed several monumental public sculptures, including Wind Harp (1967) in South San Francisco; Flame of Freedom,the Bataan War Memorial on the island of Corregidor; the 80' sculpture Cosmos, the fountain Pierine in New York City, Breakthrough, etc.) Wind Harp (1967) was designed for and installed on a hilltop in a South San Francisco industrial park. Originally it was called Cabot, Cabot and Forbes, after the developers of the industrial park. 92 feet tall and made of open metalwork of rusted steel, it is an aeolian harp, strummed by wind. 

Since the late 20th century, Demetrios has designed, fabricated and installed a large number of commissioned works for the gardens of private collectors, including several bronze fountains. In addition, he has had several gallery and museum shows featuring his figurative bronze sculptures, such as Trickster; his abstract bronze sculptures, such as The Cube, and his painted or patinaed steel sculptures, such as Tomorrow's Dreams. Many of these pieces are held in private collections. 

In 2002, Demetrios won the "Santa Barbara Beautiful Award" for the most beautiful work of public art. It was given to acknowledge his 18' bronze fountain, Mentors, a centerpiece at Santa Barbara City College, in a site overlooking the Pacific Ocean. The Fountain was donated to the campus by Eli Luria and Michael Towbes, two Santa Barbara philanthropists. Each owns other works by Demetrios.

Solo exhibitions 

2009 Wiford Gallery, Santa Fe, NM
2009 Jardin De La Granada, Santa Barbara, CA
2009 Sullivan Goss Gallery, Santa Barbara, CA
2000 Vail Gallery, Des Moines, IA
1997 Addison Ripley Gallery, Washington, D.C.
1992 Michael Dunev Gallery, San Francisco, CA
1992 Michael Dunev Gallery, San Francisco, CA
1992 Carl Cherry Center for the Arts, Carmel, CA
1991 Trition Museum, Santa Clara, CA
1991 Michael Dunev Gallery, San Francisco, CA
1989 Ianetti-Lanzone Gallery, San Francisco, CA
1988 Triton Museum, Santa Clara, CA
1987 Gallery 30, San Mateo, CA 1985 Victor Fischer Gallery, Oakland, CA
1981 Lyman Allyn Museum, New London, CT
1980 New Britain Museum of American Art, New Britain, CT
1980 San Francisco Gallery, San Francisco, CA
1967 M.H. de Young Museum, San Francisco, CA 1965 Stanford University Union, Stanford, CA
1962 Golden Gate Gallery, San Francisco, CA

Group exhibitions 

2008 Sullivan Goss Gallery, Santa Barbara, CA
2001 Vail Gallery, Des Moines, IA
1998 Addison Ripley Gallery, Washington D.C.
1996 Addison Ripley Gallery, Washington, D.C.
1990 Beyond the Frame, ALZA, Palo Alto, CA
1989 Gallerie des Arts Quotidiens, Paris
1988 Bay Area Bronzes, Walnut Creek Cultural Center, Walnut Creek, CA
1986 San Francisco Sculpture Festival, San Francisco, CA 1985; Civic Arts Gallery, Walnut Creek, CA
1984 Hastings Law School Gallery, San Francisco, CA
1983 San Jose Institute of Contemporary Art, San Jose, CA
1983 Brook House Gallery, Orinda, CA
1982 International Sculpture Conference Invitational, Oakland, CA
1981 San Francisco A.I.A., San Francisco, CA
1980 Gloucester Lyceum, Gloucester, MA
1976 Fine Arts Museums of San Francisco, San Francisco, CA
1968 Northern California A.I.A., San Francisco, CA

Competitions and awards 

2000 Santa Barbara Beautiful Award for Best Sculpture
1990 Award for Natoma Station Art Program, Folsom
1986 Merit Award for Fawcett Residence Program
1982 A.S.L.A. Award of Merit for Discovery Sculpture Park
1975 A.I.A. Honor Award for VINEYARD (1972), L.A.C.C. Award for PRIMAVERA
1968 San Francisco Hall of Justice Competition
1967 Pacific War Memorial Competition
1965 CVAIA Award of Excellence for PROTEUS
1964 Alameda County Competition
1964 White Memorial Competition

Major commissions 

2008-9 GENERATIONS, 21' bronze fountain, University of Southern California, Los Angeles, CA
2007-9 BEGINNINGS, 40" stainless steel, University of California, Merced, Merced, CA
2007 VULCAN, 4 Meter stainless steel, Benarrosh collection, Montecito, CA
2006 OCEANUS, 9' bronze fountain, Cohasset, MA
2006 NAIAD, 9' bronze, Tragos Collection, Montecito, CA
2005 CITIZEN, bronze figure and flag, ATT Building, Minneapolis, MN
2004 ACROBATS, 14- 7' bronze figures, Pacific Commons, Fremont, CA
2002 SURGE, Dart/Cohen Collection, Santa Barbara, CA
2001 JOIE DE VIVRE, 9 Acrobats, Emmons Collection, Santa Barbara, CA
2000 MENTORS, 18', City College of Santa Barbara, CA
1998 ARC, 11' stainless steel, Gov. and Mrs Mark Warner, Arlington VA
1996 THE CART, 12 figures, 7', HealthSouth Corporate Headquarters, Birmingham, AL
1992 Bronze Fountain, Kawea Hospital, Visalia, CA
1992 CALL ME ISHMAEL, bronze, 7' tall, Harper Group, San Francisco, CA
1991 ON THE EDGE, bronze, 10' tall, Private Residence, Adrian, MI
1990 KING AND CONSORT, bronze, two elements, 8' tall, Private residence, Atherton, CA
1990 COSMOS, Painted steel, 80' tall, Olympus Pointe, Roseville, CA
1990 GOLDMAN ENVIRONMENTAL AWARD, bronze on granite, San Francisco, CA
1989 FIGURE, bronze, 10' tall, Private residence, Atherton, CA
1989 FLIGHT, bronze fountain, 10' tall
1989 CELEBRATION, stainless steel fountain, 25' tall, Pacific Concourse, Los Angeles, CA
1989 SEA URCHIN, bronze fountain, 8' diameter, Jack London Square, Oakland, CA
1989 STELE, bronze fountain, 10' tall, Private residence, San Diego, CA
1989 RED GOTHIC, Painted steel, 7' tall, Alta Plaza Park, San Francisco, CA
1989 DOG GOD, bronze, 7' tall, Private residence, Ross, CA
1988 CELEBRATIONS, 25', Pacific Concourse, Los Angeles, CA
1988 ZIG, painted steel, 6' tall, Private residence, Inverness, CA
1988 THREE DISKS, painted steel, 6.5' tall, Private residence, Glen Ellen, CA
1988 SOLSTICE, painted steel, 6' tall, Private residence, Atherton, CA
1988 SPRING, Bronze fountain, 7' tall, One Ygnacio Plaza, Walnut Creek, CA
1988 I/THOU, bronze fountain, two elements, 8.5' tall, Private residence, Glen Ellen, CA
1988 DUE, bronze fountain, Private residence, Pebble Beach, CA
1988 PEIRENE, bronze, 10' tall, Entrance Plaza, The Corinthian, New York City, NY
1986 EGIRIA, bronze fountain, 8' tall, Private Residence, San Francisco, CA
1986 A FANFARE OF DOLPHINS, bronze fountain, 14' tall, Marine World Africa USA, Vallejo, CA
1986 MERLIN, painted steel, 25' tall, Research Development Park, Emeryville, CA
1985 SOURCE, bronze fountain, 15' tall Airport Technology Park, Santa Clara, CA,
1984 BREAKTHROUGH, Painted steel, 12' x 20' x 30', Airport Technology Park, Santa Clara, CA
1984 CRUCIBLE, bronze, 8' tall, Washington, San Francisco, CA
1984 FORMS SUNG IN A KELP FOREST, Bronze fountain, 6 elements 12'4" tall, Monterey Bay Aquarium, Monterey, CA
1984 SENTINEL II, bronze fountain, 13' tall, Private residence, San Francisco, CA
1983 CARING, bronze, two elements 19' tall, Atrium of 2855 Telegraph Ave., Berkeley, CA
1983 INTERLOCK, bronze, 5' tall, Trans Pacific Centre, Oakland, CA
1983 ARCHON, bronze, 5' tall, Trans Pacific Centre, Oakland, CA
1982 EARTH SHIFT, bronze fountain, 12' tall, Trans Pacific Centre, Oakland, CA
1981-82 FOUNTAIN, Four groups in bronze, 6' tall, EBSCO Headquarters, Birmingham, AL
1980 INSCRIPTION FOUNTAIN, Bronze, 40' x 10', Heritage Park, Ft. Worth, TX
1979 DISCOVERY SCULPTURE PARK, Thirty small bronze sculptures, Nationwide Plaza, Columbus, OH
1979 ST. JOSEPH, ST. MARY, Two bronze reliefs, life size, Our Lady of Fatima Church, Modesto, CA
1978 SUNBURST, Three Corten steel reliefs, 10' x 4', Peerless Electric Company, Berkeley, CA
1977 SEA HARVEST, bronze fountain, 4' tall, lSawyer Free Library, Gloucester, MA
1977 WINVANE, bronze, kinetic, 6' tall Private residence, Sausalito, CA
1976 SUNBURST, bronze helix /sphere, 26' diameter Suspended over atrium, Phoenix Hyatt Regency Hotel, Phoenix, AZ
1975 FOUNTAIN, bronze, 4' x 5' x 4', Banker's Equity Building, San Francisco, CA
1975 SEASCAPES, Series of bronze fountains, 9' x 12' x 11', Terrace Garden Inn, Atlanta, GA
1973 GIRLS DANCING, bronze figures, ¼ life size, Mary Institute, St. Louis, CA
1973 INTERFACE, bronze fountain, 7' x 8', First Unitarian Church, San Francisco, CA
1973 SENTINELS, bronze, 8' x 6' x 10', City College of San Francisco, San Francisco, CA
1972 ARIZONA, Triad of copper reliefs, 11' x 10', First National Bank of Arizona, Phoenix, AZ
1971 TUMBLER, Corten steel, 12' x 13' x 10', Public Square, Springfield, MO
1971 PRIMAVERA, bronze fountain, 35' tall, The Prudential, Los Angeles, CA
1970 OCEANUS, bronze and copper fountain, 70' x 14' x 10', Milton Hershey School, Hershey, PA
1970 TWO CONIC SECTIONS, bronze fountain, 18' tall, Summit Savings & Loan, Santa Rosa, CA
1970 CLOCK TOWER, Corten steel, kinetic, 11' x 11' x 22', Park Newport, Newport Beach, CA
1970 TRIAD, chromed aluminum, suspended kinetic, 35' tall, Park Plaza, Oshkosh, WI
1969 FOUNTAIN, bronze, 6' x 6' x 4', The Bank of California, Portland, OR
1968 THE GOLDEN FLEECE, bronze relief, 22' long, Wells Fargo Bank, Oakland, CA
1968 FLAME OF FREEDOM, Corten steel, 40' tall, Corregidor Island, the Philippines
1968 RELIEF (untitled), bronze and copper, 7' x 4', Mercy Hospital Carmichael, CA
1967 HARP WIND, 92', South San Francisco park, CA
1967 WIND HARP (formerly CABOT, CABOT AND FORBES TOWER), Mayari R steel, 92' tall, CFF Industrial Park, South San Francisco, CA
1967 SKY DIVERS, Three bronze double-life size figures, 30' tall, Fashion Island, Newport Beach, CA
1967 FLIGHT, bronze and copper, 9' tall, Private Residence, Woodside, CA
1966 GENESIS, bronze and copper fountain, 22' wide, 10' tall, Northwest Plaza, St. Louis, MO
1965 PROTEUS, bronze and copper fountain, 32' diameter, 6" tall, Sacramento County Courthouse, CA
1964 RENAISSANCE, bronze and copper, 16' tall, ALCO Park, Oakland, CA
1964 White Memorial Fountain, bronze and copper, 16' tall, Stanford University, Stanford, CA
1963 SPRAY, bronze copper fountain, 4' x4' x 7' tall, Sonoma Mortgage Company Santa Rosa, CA
1962 SUN AND WAVE, bronze and steel relief, 6' x 10', Royal Pacific Motel, San Francisco, CA

Public Service 
CHAIR. UN 50TH ANNIVERSARY SAN FRANCISCO, CREATION OF UN PLAZA, SF
SAN FRANCISCO ART COMMISSIONER 1989-93
ACQUISITIONS COMMITTEE SFMOMA (ARCHITECTURE AND DESIGN) 1992-5
ARTIST IN RESIDENCE UC SANTA BARBARA 1998-2000

Bibliography 
1966 Davenport, "ART TREASURES OF THE WEST", Sunset Magazine
1970 Mendelwitz, A HISTORY OF AMERICAN ART Rinehart
1973 H.U.D., ARTISTS IN AMERICA
1988 Hockaday, AT THE GARDENS OF SAN FRANCISCO, Timber Press
1988 Loewer, AMERICAN GARDENS, Simon & Schuster
1988 Murray, HOME LANDSCAPING
1989 Katz, THE FOUNTAINS OF SAN FRANCISCO

Telemedia 
1987 BREAKTHROUGH, a documentary by Eames Demetrios, first shown in April 1987 on KQED-TV. San Francisco. Distributed by Home Video Artist Series. 
2009, Demetrios was featured on Santa Barbara's Channel 21 – Artist Series

References

External links
 Demetrios biography, Sullivan Goss Gallery
 "Art by Aristides Demetrios", Belgravia Gallery

1932 births
Living people
American sculptors
Harvard College alumni
University of California alumni